The 2021 TCR China season is the fifth season of the TCR's Chinese Touring Car Championship.

Teams and drivers

Calendar and results
The revised calendar was announced on 30 April 2021.

Championship standings

Drivers' championship

Scoring systems

Teams' championship

References

External links 

 TCR China Series Official website

TCR China Series
China Touring Car Championship